Billy or Bill Hayes may refer to:

In entertainment
 Bill Hayes (actor) (born 1925), American actor and singer
 Bill Hayes (television producer), executive producer of Jon & Kate + 8
 Billy Hayes (musician) (born 1985), drummer in Wavves and formerly of Jay Reatard
 Billie Hayes (19242021), American television, film, and stage actress
 Bill Hays (director) (1938–2006), British television director

In sport
 Bill Hayes (American football) (born 1943), former head coach at Winston-Salem State University and North Carolina A&T State University
 Bill Hayes (Australian footballer) (1896–1969), Australian rules footballer
 Bill Hayes (baseball) (born 1957), catcher for the Chicago Cubs
 Bill Hayes (footballer, born 1915) (1915–1987), Irish footballer who played for Huddersfield Town, Cork United and Burnley
 Billy Hayes (footballer) (1895–?), English footballer who played as a goalkeeper

Other people
 Bill Hayes (politician) (born 1952), member of the Ohio House of Representatives
 Billy Hayes (trade unionist) (born 1953), leader of the Communication Workers' Union
 Billy Hayes (writer) (born 1947), author of Midnight Express
 Bill Hayes (writer) (born 1961), author of Insomniac City
 Bill Hayes (pharmacist), Australian pharmacist

See also 
 William Hayes (disambiguation)